Stephen Neumann (born October 2, 1991) is a former American soccer player. Steve Neumann was selected 4th overall in the 2014 MLS draft and played 3 seasons for the New England Revolution making 36 appearances.

Career

College and Amateur 
Neumann played four years of college soccer at Georgetown University between 2010 and 2013. He ended his Georgetown career with 41 goals and 34 assists and was twice an NSCAA Second Team All American.  While at Georgetown, Neumann also appeared for USL PDL club Reading United AC from 2011 to 2013. Neumann was named Reading United captain in 2013 and finished his career with Reading having played 29 matches and scoring 7 goals.

Professional 
On January 16, 2014, Neumann was selected in the first round (4th overall) of the 2014 MLS SuperDraft by New England Revolution.

Neumann made his professional debut on April 5, 2014, in a 2-0 loss against D.C. United.

Neumann was released by New England at the end of 2016 season, and announced his retirement via Twitter on December 22, 2016.

References

External links 
 

1991 births
Living people
American soccer players
American people of German descent
Association football forwards
Georgetown Hoyas men's soccer players
Major League Soccer players
NCAA Division I Men's Soccer Tournament Most Outstanding Player winners
New England Revolution draft picks
New England Revolution players
People from New Hope, Pennsylvania
Reading United A.C. players
Soccer players from Pennsylvania
USL League Two players